The 1984-85 LSU Tigers men's basketball team represented Louisiana State University during the 1984–85 NCAA men's college basketball season. The head coach was Dale Brown. The team was a member of the Southeastern Conference and played their home games at LSU Assembly Center.

The Tigers finished in first place in the SEC regular season standings, but lost to Auburn in the quarterfinals of the SEC Tournament. LSU received an at-large bid to the NCAA tournament as No. 4 seed in the Southeast region where they were upset in the opening round to Navy. The team finished with an 19–10 record (13–5 SEC).

Roster

Schedule and results

|-
!colspan=9 style=| Exhibition

|-
!colspan=9 style=| Regular season

|-
!colspan=12 style=| SEC Tournament

|-
!colspan=12 style=| NCAA Tournament

Rankings

Team players drafted into the NBA

References

LSU Tigers basketball seasons
Lsu
Lsu
LSU
LSU